Coleophora galatellae is a moth of the family Coleophoridae. It is found from Germany to the Pyrenees and Italy and from France to Hungary. It is also known from southern Russia.

The larvae feed on Aster linosyris.

References

galatellae
Moths described in 1942
Moths of Europe